Kpali is a 2019 Nigerian comedy film directed by Ladipo Johnson and produced by Emem Ema, the movie stars Ini Dima-Okojie, Nkem Owoh, Gloria Anozie Young, Linda Ejiofor and Kunle Remi. ‘Kpali’ is term that is generally recognized in Nigerian pop culture as a term for passport or certificates which was applied in the same way in the movie.

Plot 
Kpali tells the story of 20 something year old London-based workaholic single investment banker, Amaka Kalayor, who has no time for anything else asides her job. Amaka's parents constantly nag her to get married. They get the perfect opportunity when Amaka is sent to Nigeria alongside her caucasian colleague, Jack Hunter to close a multi-billion Naira deal. Unbeknownst to them, her ability to stay in London and retain her visa (kpali) is dependent on a 30-day deadline based on the outcome of the deal. Amaka's parents mistake Jack for her fiancé and simply see an opportunity to execute two weddings – Amaka’s and her sister Anuli’s. Amaka gets torn between two men when she becomes closer to her colleague, Jack and her brother-in-law's cousin, Jidenna.

Cast 

 Ini Dima-Okojie as Amaka Kalayor 
 Torin Pocock as Jack Hunter 
 Nkem Owoh as Mr. Kalayor
 Gloria Anozie-Young as Mrs. Kalayor
 Linda Ejiofor as Amaka's sister, Anuli
 Kunle Remi as Jidenna
IK Osakioduwa
Uzor Arukwe
Seyi Law
Abounce

Production and release 
Kpali was shot in different locations in Lagos and London. The movie opened in cinemas on 20 December 2019.

Reception 
Gbenga Bada of Pulse Nigeria in his review said "‘Kpali’ is not totally predictable, nevertheless, it's funny, relatable and it’s just the kind of comedy movie most Nigerians love."

Toni Kan of The Lagos Review said "But as Nollywood movies go, this is a feel good romp and a very relatable movie that will appeal to millennials who are battling that transition from dependency to independence while evading that pesky question – Nne, when are you getting married?"

Nollywood Reinvented compared watching Kpali to "watching a drawn out skit that just refuses to end."

References

External links 

Nigerian comedy films
2019 comedy films
2010s English-language films
English-language Nigerian films